This is a list of uses of balloons

tiny
balloon catheter
balloon tamponade
Graphene balloons
small (volume of a few litres)
gas balloon
Balloon Drop
cluster ballooning
Talking balloon
toy balloon
water balloon
papier-mâché
balloon modelling
decoration
solar balloon
balloon mail as part of a balloon flight competition or to spread information
balloon helicopter
balloon rocket, demonstration of rocket propulsion
ceiling balloon
decoys accompanying ICBMs in midcourse, see also countermeasure
A vessel for storing nitrous oxide prior to inhalation for use as a recreational drug
medium (volume of tens to thousands of litres)
free flying
high-altitude balloon
hopper balloon
fire balloon for the transport of bombs (in World War II, FUGO-Balloon)
transport of propaganda (in World War II and in the Cold War)
ceiling balloon
weather balloon used with a radiosonde
fixed
for carrying advertising signs
to carry a radio antenna
toy balloon
research balloon
Skyhook balloon
superpressure balloon
other
balloon tires, for vehicles that require low ground pressures
large (volume up to 12,000,000 litres) 
free flying
balloon (aircraft)
lifting people, or daring prison escapes, usually with a hot air balloon, Rozière balloon or a gas balloon
airship, a steerable balloon
hybrid airship, which combines characteristics of heavier-than-air (HTA) technology, fixed-wing aircraft or helicopter, and lighter-than-air (LTA), aerostat technology.
research balloon with instrumentation, also to carry telescopes
rockoon, a carrier for rockets.
balloon satellite for space research.
espionage balloon for military reconnaissance
hopper balloon
fixed
as manned observation post (before World War II)
barrage balloon
observation balloon for military reconnaissance
positioning atomic bombs for bomb tests in the atmosphere
 moored balloon

Balloons